Jeong Shung-hoon (born 4 July 1979) is a South Korean footballer who most recently played for Bucheon FC as striker. He has also represented South Korea national football team.

Career
He started his career at Ulsan Hyundai Horang-i in 2002. He was a promising striker and was selected for the South Korean national team for the 2001 Universiade game, but didn't play very well. He said in an interview that "I was under stress that I had to play well to make something impressive, so I think it is the main reason I couldn't make many goals or contributions to team." Then, finally, he transferred to Daejeon Citizen, making a turning point in his career.

However, he did not fulfil his role in Daejeon Citizen, and could not impress fans of the club. He seemed to have disappeared in Daejeon Citizen's sight. Despite this, he seemed revived at Purple Arena (Nickname of Daejeon World Cup Stadium) after the mid-2006 season. He created a fantastic goal in the first league game after the 2006 World Cup against Ulsan Hyundai Horang-i, and continuously played a pivotal role in the attacking line and managed to score 8 goals in the remainder of the season.

Then he moved to Busan I'Park, in an exchange with Park Sung-Ho, in 2008. Since then, he has impressed the fans with great ability as a target man, and has made his debut for the South Korea national football team on 15 October 2008. At the match against FC Seoul, he clapped at a referee's decision to give a red card at Adi, FC Seoul player. His bad performance whilst playing for South Korea national football team disappointed Korean soccer fans and Huh Jung-Moo, and resulted in the return of Lee Dong-Gook in the national team.

On 11 January 2011, he was transferred from Busan I'Park to the Jeonbuk Hyundai Motors with Lee Seung-Hyun for Lee Yo-Han and Lim Sang-Hyub. He made his Jeonbuk debut on 2 March in a 1–0 Champions League group stage win over Shandong Luneng.

On 31 July 2012, during the 2012 summer transfer windows, Jeong was transferred to Chunnam Dragons for forward Kim Shin-young.

Club statistics

References

External links
 
 National Team Player Record 
 
 
 

1979 births
Living people
Association football forwards
South Korean footballers
South Korean expatriate footballers
South Korea international footballers
Ulsan Hyundai FC players
Daejeon Hana Citizen FC players
Busan IPark players
Jeonbuk Hyundai Motors players
Jeonnam Dragons players
Hokkaido Consadole Sapporo players
Bucheon FC 1995 players
K League 1 players
K League 2 players
J2 League players
Korea National League players
Expatriate footballers in Japan
South Korean expatriate sportspeople in Japan
Sportspeople from South Gyeongsang Province